Lincoln Ramblers Football Club was an English football club from Lincoln.

History
The club was formed 1878 and played local matches only before entering the FA Cup in 1887–88.  The Ramblers were drawn at home to Notts County, but agreed to switch the tie to County's Trent Bridge ground.  Despite Notts starting with only ten men, the half-time score was 6-0 to County, and the Ramblers conceded three more in the second half.

The club recovered from this defeat to go on its best run in the Lincolnshire Senior Cup in 1888-89, reaching the semi-final, where the club lost 5-0 to Grimsby Town at the John O'Gaunt's ground, despite loaning Smith from Gainsborough Trinity for the match.  The Ramblers' fans did not take kindly to the defeat, pelting the Grimsby players with stones and orange peel, and forcing them to require a police escort back to the club's hotel.

The tie may have been the club's last match, as the Lincolnshire Football Association suspended the club afterwards for "objectionable conduct" until the start of 1890, and the club never re-started.

Colours

The club's colours were black, with a white sash.

References

Defunct football clubs in Lincolnshire